Zlaté dno  is a Czech comedy film. It was released in 1942.

External links
 

1942 films
1942 comedy films
Czech black-and-white films
Czech comedy films
1940s Czech films